The Princeton Quadrangle Club, often abbreviated to "Quad", is one of the eleven eating clubs at Princeton University that remain open.  Located at 33 Prospect Avenue, the club is currently "sign-in," meaning it permits any second semester sophomore, junior or senior to join. The club's tradition of openness is demonstrated as far back as 1970,  when Quadrangle became one of the first coeducational eating clubs (Princeton University itself began admitting women in 1969, and the last eating clubs to include women did so in 1991).

History

The club was formed in 1896 in a house built on the south side of Prospect Avenue.  In its early years, it changed its location several times.  In 1901, it moved to the north side of "the Street," and in 1903 it moved back to the south side, where the Princeton Tower Club now stands.  In 1910 it moved to a house built in 1887 for James McCosh, the eleventh president of Princeton University.  In 1915, Quadrangle Club sold the McCosh house and built its own house, designed by Henry Milliken, Princeton Class of 1905 in a classic brick Georgian Revival structure.  The club has existed in this building since 1916.

F. Scott Fitzgerald described Quadrangle Club in This Side of Paradise as "Literary Quadrangle."  Fitzgerald later commented that he might have felt more comfortable in "Literary Quadrangle" with contemporaries such as John Peale Bishop, an American poet.

In 2016, Quad signed-in 115 new members, a 342% increase from the year before and more than any other sign-in eating club except for Terrace Club. The current Chairman of the Board is alumnus Dinesh Maneyapanda.

Musical tradition
With some funding from the Princeton Undergraduate Student Government, the Quadrangle Club has hosted to some of the biggest concerts on Princeton's campus, including Barenaked Ladies in 1993, Lifehouse in 2003, Maroon 5 in 2004, Rihanna in 2006, and T-Pain in 2013.  These concerts have been documented as having drawn more than half of the university's entire undergraduate population. Below is a listing of the groups that have performed at the club in recent years at the semiannual University-wide festival called "Lawnparties".

The club’s perspicacious interest in music also extends to identifying early musical talent and booking intimate club music evenings with future superstars. For example, in the late 1980s Blues Traveler played a party at Quadrangle before the release of their first album.

Notable alumni 
 Stephen Ailes '33 - United States Secretary of the Army 1964-1965
 R. W. Apple, Jr. '57 - New York Times editor
 Robert L. Belknap '51 - Russian literature scholar and dean of Columbia College
 Jeff Bezos '86 - founder of Amazon.com
 Eduardo Bhatia '86 - 15th President of the Senate of Puerto Rico
 John Peale Bishop '17 - writer, poet
 Kit Bond '60 - former U.S. senator and governor of Missouri
 Ralph D. Denunzio '56 - investment banker and chairman of the New York Stock Exchange
 Fred E. Fox '39 - collector of Princeton traditions known as "Keeper of the Princetoniana"
 Robert F. Goheen '40 - president of Princeton University and U.S. Ambassador to India
 Yvonne Gonzalez Rogers '87 - US District Judge for the United States District Court for the Northern District of California
 J. Robert Hillier '59 - Founder of Hillier Architecture (sold to RMJM in 2007)
 David Huebner '82 - United States Ambassador to New Zealand and Samoa
Wentworth Miller '95 - Actor, model and screenwriter
 Jerome Powell '75 - Chair of the Federal Reserve
 Neil L. Rudenstine '56 - Former president of Harvard University.
 George P. Shultz '42 - Former United States Secretary of Labor, Secretary of the Treasury, Secretary of State, and president of Bechtel.
 Adlai Stevenson '22 - governor of Illinois, U.S. Ambassador to the United Nations, and Democratic Party nominee for President in 1952 and 1956
Robert Venturi '47 - Architect (at Princeton: Wu Hall, Lewis Thomas Laboratory, Frist Campus Center)
 Sir Gordon Wu '58 - Chairman of Hopewell Holdings

Notes

References

External links 
Princeton Quadrangle Club undergraduate website
Princeton Quadrangle Club alumni website

Eating clubs at Princeton University
Georgian Revival architecture in New Jersey
Historic district contributing properties in Mercer County, New Jersey